Wang Yong is the name of:

Wang Yong (politician) (born 1955), State Councilor of the People's Republic of China
Wang Yong (politician) (born 1957), former vice-chairman of the Hainan Provincial Committee of the Chinese People's Political Consultative Conference
Wang Yong (musician) (born 1964) Chinese rock and world music musician
Wang Yong (weightlifter) (born 1968), Chinese weightlifter
Wang Yong (water polo) (born 1979), Chinese water polo player

See also
Wang Yeong (disambiguation)